Edward George Geoffrey Smith-Stanley, 14th Earl of Derby,  (29 March 1799 – 23 October 1869), known before 1834 as Edward Stanley, and from 1834 to 1851 as Lord Stanley) was a British statesman, three-time Prime Minister of the United Kingdom and, to date, the longest-serving leader of the Conservative Party. He was a scion of one of Britain's oldest, wealthiest and most powerful families. He is one of only four British prime ministers to have three or more separate periods in office. However, his ministries each lasted less than two years and totalled three years and 280 days.  Derby introduced the state education system in Ireland, and reformed Parliament.

Historian Frances Walsh has written that it was Derby:

Scholars long ignored his role but in the 21st century rank him highly among all British prime ministers.

Background and education
Stanley was born to Lord Stanley (later the 13th Earl of Derby) and his wife, Charlotte Margaret, the daughter of the Reverend Geoffrey Hornby. The Stanleys were a long-established and very wealthy landowning family whose principal residence was Knowsley Hall in Lancashire. He is believed to have been the richest Prime Minister in British history prior to Rishi Sunak's appointment in 2022. The family estates were based on 57,000 acres in Lancashire, and were worth at least £163,000 per annum in 1883.

Stanley was educated at Eton College and at Christ Church, Oxford. Inspired by his grandfather, Stanley was devoted to traditional institutions and the sacrosanctity of property rights. From his mother, Stanley adopted a deep evangelical streak that typically influenced his decisions.

Early political career, 1822–1852
In 1822 Edward Stanley, as he was then, was elected to Parliament in the rotten borough of Stockbridge as a Whig, the traditional party of his family. In 1824, however, he alienated some of his Whig colleagues by voting against Joseph Hume's motion for an investigation into the established Protestant Church of Ireland. He lost his seat in 1826. When the Whigs returned to power in 1830, Stanley became Chief Secretary for Ireland in Lord Grey's Government, and entered the Cabinet in 1831. As Chief Secretary Stanley pursued a series of coercive measures which frequently brought him into conflict with the Lord Lieutenant of Ireland, Lord Anglesey.  In October 1831, Stanley wrote a letter, the Stanley Letter, to the Duke of Leinster establishing the system of National Education in Ireland. This letter remains today the legal basis for the predominant form of primary education in Ireland. In 1833, Stanley moved up to the more important position of Secretary of State for War and the Colonies, overseeing the passage of the Abolition of Slavery Bill.

Stanley, a religiously devout Anglican, broke with the ministry over the reform of the Anglican Church of Ireland in 1834 and resigned from the government. He then formed a group called the "Derby Dilly" and attempted to chart a middle course between what they saw as the increasingly radical Whiggery of Lord John Russell and the conservatism of the Tories. Tory leader Sir Robert Peel's turn to the centre with the 1834 Tamworth Manifesto, published three days before Stanley's "Knowsley Creed" speech, robbed the Stanleyites of much of the uniqueness of their programme.

The term "Derby Dilly" was coined by Irish Nationalist leader Daniel O'Connell.  Besides Stanley, the other principal members of the Dilly were Sir James Graham, who had resigned as First Lord of the Admiralty; Lord Ripon, who had resigned as Lord Privy Seal; and the Duke of Richmond, who had resigned as Postmaster General. These four ministers had come from notably different political backgrounds—Stanley and Graham were old Whigs, Ripon was a former Canningite Tory prime minister, while Richmond was an arch-conservative Tory who had incongruously found himself in the Grey cabinet.

Although they did not participate in Peel's short-lived 1835 ministry, over the next several years they gradually merged into Peel's Conservative Party, with several members of the "Derby Dilly" taking prominent positions in Peel's second ministry.  Joining the Conservatives, Stanley again served as Colonial Secretary in Peel's second government in 1841. In 1844 he was summoned to the House of Lords as Lord Stanley of Bickerstaffe in his father's Barony of Stanley by Writ of Acceleration.  He broke with the Prime Minister again in 1845, this time over the repeal of the Corn Laws, and managed to bring the majority of the Conservative Party with him (including, among others, the young Benjamin Disraeli). He thereafter led the protectionist faction of the Conservative Party.  In the House of Lords, on 23 November 1847, he accused the Irish Catholic clergy of using the confessional to encourage lawlessness and crime. This was disputed in a series of letters by the coadjutor Bishop of Derry, Edward Maginn.  In 1851 he succeeded his father as Earl of Derby.

The party system was in a state of flux when the Conservatives left office in 1846, the outstanding issues being the question of Ireland and the unresolved franchise.  The protectionists had a core of leaders, of whom Derby was a leading light.

Premierships, 1852–1869
He is the only modern-era prime minister who never enjoyed a parliamentary majority. In his private diary, the Earl of Malmesbury in 1857 commented on Derby's failure to exploit the press:

First government

Derby formed a minority government in February 1852 following the collapse of Lord John Russell's Whig Government. In this new ministry, Benjamin Disraeli was appointed Chancellor of the Exchequer. With many senior Conservative ministers having followed Peel, Derby was forced to appoint many new men to the office of the Cabinet, only three were pre-existing Privy Counsellors. When the aged Duke of Wellington, by then very deaf, heard the list of inexperienced cabinet ministers being read aloud in the House of Lords, he gave the government its nickname by shouting "Who? Who?". From then this government would be known as the "Who? Who?" ministry.

Traditionally Derby's ministries were thought in hindsight to have been dominated by Disraeli. However, recent research suggests that this was not always the case, especially in the government's conduct of foreign policy. There, Derby and his Foreign Secretaries, Lord Malmesbury and later his son Lord Stanley, pursued a course of action that was aimed at building up power through financial strength, seeking to avoid wars at all costs, co-operating with other powers, and working through the Concert of Europe to resolve diplomatic problems. This contrasted sharply with the policy of military strength and prestige that Disraeli would later pursue, and Derby's very different take on foreign policy could be seen as the precursor of "splendid isolation", as well as the diplomatic settlement of Europe pursued by later Conservatives in the late 19th century and the 1930s.

In the general election of June 1852, the Conservative party under Derby and Disraeli won only 330 seats in the House of Commons—42.9% of the total.  Although the Whigs actually won fewer seats—292 seats—there were several small groups in Parliament that might be willing to side with the Whigs on particular issues, including the 38 Conservative members of Parliament who were Peelites, who had already joined with the Whigs in June 1846 to repeal the Corn Laws; the 113 members who were Free Traders and who were interested in eliminating all tariffs on consumer goods; and the 63 members of the Irish Brigade who were interested in the independence of Ireland and Tenant's Rights for Irish tenants.  Immediately following the election in June 1852, none of these small groups were willing to work with the Whigs to form a government.  Accordingly, the Earl of Derby was invited to form a minority government.  Derby did so and appointed Disraeli as the new Chancellor of the Exchequer.

As with all minority governments, Derby's minority government had a difficult time governing.  Their main preoccupation was avoiding any issue which might cause any of the government's small components to go over to Whigs and cause a "no confidence" vote.  However, the real issues facing Parliament could not be postponed for long, and when Disraeli submitted his first budget to Parliament in December 1852, it proved so unpopular with the Peelites, the Free Traders, and the Irish Brigade that it was voted down in a "no confidence" vote.  As a result, Derby's minority government fell, making way for a Peelite–Whig coalition under Lord Aberdeen.  When Aberdeen's administration fell in 1855, Queen Victoria asked Derby to form a government. Much to the consternation of some sections of his party, including Disraeli, Derby declined this offer, believing that he would be in a position to form a stronger government after a short-lived failed administration led by one of the Conservative Party's rivals such as Lord John Russell or Lord Palmerston.

Second government

In 1858, Derby formed another minority government upon the resignation of Lord Palmerston following a parliamentary defeat to an opposition motion which, in the context of a failed plot to assassinate Napoleon III of France, charged that "the ministry had admitted they sheltered assassins". Disraeli was again at the Exchequer and Leader of the Commons. Among the notable achievements of this administration was the end of the British East India Company following the Indian Rebellion of 1857, which brought India under direct British control for the first time. Once again the government was short-lived, resigning after only one year, having narrowly lost a vote of no-confidence brought by Lord Hartington on behalf of various Whig and Radical factions which had coalesced at the Willis's Rooms meetings in St James's Street to mark the birth of the Liberal Party. In July 1859, Derby was appointed a Knight of the Garter.

Back in opposition, Derby pursued a strategy of trying to lure the Prime Minister, Lord Palmerston, away from his more radical colleagues, Lord John Russell in particular.  This tactic was thwarted by Russell's declining influence and by Chancellor of the Exchequer Gladstone's 1861 budget which united the cabinet and increased divisions amongst the Conservatives. Palmerston continued as Prime Minister until his death in 1865, when he was succeeded by the frail Russell.

Third government

Derby returned to power for the third and last time in 1866, following the collapse of Lord Russell's second government after its failed attempt at further electoral reform. Once again, Disraeli was a leading figure. This administration was particularly notable for the passage of the Reform Act 1867, which greatly expanded the suffrage but which provoked the resignation of three cabinet ministers including the Secretary for India and three-time future Prime Minister, Lord Cranborne (later Lord Salisbury). In early 1868, Derby retired from political life on medical advice, leaving Disraeli to succeed him. In 1869, he was appointed a Knight Grand Cross of the Order of St Michael and St George in recognition of his former role as Secretary of State for War and the Colonies.

Although a great orator, Derby was frequently criticised for his languid leadership. Nevertheless, he had many significant achievements, both as minister and Prime Minister, and has been described as the father of the modern Conservative Party. His tenure of 22 years as party leader still stands as the longest in Conservative Party history and indeed the history of any other political party in British history. Only Labour's Clement Attlee came close, at 20 years.

Family

Stanley married The Hon. Emma Bootle-Wilbraham, the second daughter of Edward Bootle-Wilbraham, on 31 May 1825. He left three children:

Stanley's ancestors were Kings of Man from 1405 and later Lords of Man. Thomas Stanley, 1st Earl of Derby famously switched sides at the Battle of Bosworth and placed the crown of the fallen King Richard III upon the head of Henry Tudor.

Legacy

Historian David Cannadine argues:

Historian Frances Walsh has written:

The National School system in Ireland, the predominant form of primary school education, remains based on the multi-denominational system set up by Stanley in the Stanley Letter. The letter had tried to deal with the seemingly intractable issue of different Christian religions living together in Ireland.

The former site of Fort Langley, British Columbia was renamed Derby by the Royal Engineers in 1858, apparently in honour of the Earl, who was British Prime Minister at the time. Stanley (sometimes referred to as "Port Stanley") on East Falkland, capital of the Falkland Islands, is named after Edward Smith-Stanley as are Port Stanley in Ontario, Canada (he did not visit his namesake but he had visited nearby Port Talbot, Ontario during his Canadian/American trip in 1824), as well as the area Stanley in Hong Kong. Stanley was Prime Minister when Queen Victoria opened Wellington College, in Berkshire, a tribute to the Duke of Wellington, where the boarding house Stanley is named after him. The county of Stanley in Queensland, Australia, is named after the Earl. Notably, it contains the important Australian city of Brisbane.

A library book about Smith-Stanley titled The Earl of Derby, written by George Saintsbury and published in 1892, was borrowed from the Newtown Library in Wellington, New Zealand, in March 1902 and returned in August 2020 (118 years later) after being discovered in Sydney, Australia. The book was described as being "in OK condition".

See also

List of statues and sculptures in Liverpool

Notes and references

Further reading

 Blake, Robert "The 14th Earl of Derby" History Today (Dec 1955) 5#12 pp 850–859.
 Foster, R. E. "A Life In The Political Centre: The 14Th Earl Of Derby." History Review 64 (2009): 1–6.
 Hawkins, Angus. "Lord Derby and Victorian Conservatism: a Reappraisal." Parliamentary History 6.2 (1987): 280–301.
  online review of Hawkins vol 1
 Hawkins, Angus. The Forgotten Prime Minister: The 14th Earl of Derby: Volume II: Achievement, 1851–1869 (Vol. 2. Oxford University Press, 2007). 
 Hawkins, Angus. "A Host in Himself: Lord Derby and Aristocratic Leadership." Parliamentary History 22.1 (2003): 75–90.
 Hicks, Geoffrey. Peace, war and party politics: the Conservatives and Europe, 1846–59 (Manchester UP, 2007).
 Jones, Wilbur. Lord Derby and Victorian Conservatism (1956).
 Leonard, Dick. "Edward Stanley, 14th Earl of Derby—‘The Brilliant Chief, Irregularly Great’."  in Leonard, Nineteenth-Century British Premiers (2008) pp. 217-231.
 Stewart, Robert. The Politics of Protection: Lord Derby and the Protectionist Party, 1841–1852 (Cambridge UP, 1971).
 Ward, J. T. " Derby and Disraeli" in Donald Southgate, ed. The Conservative Leadership 1832–1932 (1974) online

Primary sources
 Hicks, Geoff, et al. eds. Documents on Conservative Foreign Policy, 1852-1878 (2013), 550 documents  excerpt

External links

 
More about The Earl of Derby on the Downing Street website.
 
 
 
 

1799 births
1869 deaths
19th-century prime ministers of the United Kingdom
Prime Ministers of the United Kingdom
People of the Victorian era
Leaders of the Conservative Party (UK)
British Secretaries of State
Stanley, Edward
Stanley, Edward Lord
Members of the Privy Council of Ireland
Members of the Privy Council of the United Kingdom
People educated at Eton College
Alumni of Christ Church, Oxford
Chancellors of the University of Oxford
Rectors of the University of Glasgow
Knights of the Garter
Knights Grand Cross of the Order of St Michael and St George
Stanley, Edward
Stanley, Edward
Stanley, Edward
Stanley, Edward
Stanley, Edward
Stanley, Edward Lord
Stanley, Edward Lord
Stanley, Edward Lord
Derby, E14
Edward
Chief Secretaries for Ireland
Conservative Party prime ministers of the United Kingdom
14
Stanley, Edward
Leaders of the House of Lords
Lancashire Militia officers